Aqcheli-ye Qerkhlar (also Romanized as Āqchelī-ye Qerkhlar) is a village in Nezamabad Rural District, in the Central District of Azadshahr County, Golestan Province, Iran. At the 2006 census, its population was 246, in 71 families.

References 

Populated places in Azadshahr County